MegaTruckers is an Australian reality television series which premiered on the A&E channel in 2012. The eight part, 30 minute series is produced by Cordell Jigsaw. It profiles Jon Kelly and the trucking fleet at his Brisbane-based trucking company Heavy Haulage Australia.

See also

 Aussie Pickers
 Outback Truckers

References

External links
 

A&E (Australian TV channel) original programming
2012 Australian television series debuts
2013 Australian television series endings
2010s Australian reality television series
English-language television shows